Our Souls at Night is a 2017 American romantic drama film directed by Ritesh Batra and written by Scott Neustadter and Michael H. Weber. It is based on the novel of same name by Kent Haruf. The film stars Robert Redford, Jane Fonda, Matthias Schoenaerts, and Judy Greer. It had its world premiere at the Venice Film Festival on September 1, 2017. It was released on September 29, 2017 by Netflix. It marked the fourth collaboration between Fonda and Redford, having previously starred in The Chase, Barefoot in the Park, and The Electric Horseman.

The film received acclaim from critics, who appreciated the film's direction, adaptation from the novel, and performances (especially Fonda), with critics widely praising the casting of Fonda and Redford and their chemistry.

Plot
The setting is the fictitious small Colorado city of Holt, where Louis Waters, a widower, and Addie Moore, a widow, have been neighbors for decades but hardly know each other. One night, Addie visits Louis to suggest they spend the night together, non-sexually, to counter their loneliness. Although Louis is initially somewhat hesitant, he soon agrees and they start spending their evenings and nights at Addie's house.

At the start of the summer, Addie's son Gene drops off his son Jamie at Addie's house, as his marriage has fallen apart. Jamie spends the entire summer with Louis and Addie, who also adopt a dog for Jamie. At the end of the summer, Gene returns to pick up Jamie and confronts Addie about her relationship with Louis, which he disapproves of because of Louis’ past affair. Addie, however, refuses to break off the relationship.

Sometime later, Addie is hospitalized after a fall. Her son Gene attempts to persuade her to move in with him, which Addie initially refuses. However, when she receives a distress phone call from Jamie in the middle of the night, she reconsiders. When she and Louis arrive at the house, they find Gene drunk and he confesses he has always believed Addie blamed him for his sister's death. She decides family must come first and decides to move in with Gene and Jamie. Addie and Louis spend their last night together. Both she and Louis are back to sleeping alone. Louis sends an electric train set for Jamie and a cell phone for her. After getting into bed, she calls him and they start talking like old friends.

Cast
 Robert Redford as Louis Waters
 Jane Fonda as Addie Moore
 Iain Armitage as Jamie Moore, Gene's son and Addie's grandson
 Matthias Schoenaerts as Gene Moore, Addie's son and Jamie's father
 Judy Greer as Holly Waters, Louis' daughter
 Phyllis Somerville as Ruth Joyce, Addie's friend
 Bruce Dern as Dorlan Becker

Production
On July 7, 2016, Netflix hired Ritesh Batra to direct the film adaptation of Kent Haruf's novel Our Souls at Night, scripted by Scott Neustadter and Michael H. Weber.

Principal photography on the film began on September 12, 2016 in Colorado Springs, Colorado, and it also was shot in Florence, Colorado. Filming was completed on November 2, 2016.

Release
The film had its world premiere at the Venice Film Festival on September 1, 2017. It was released on September 29, 2017 on Netflix streaming.
The film's release in the United Kingdom attracted some commentary from critics and media observers because the first two words of the title sound (when read aloud) like "arseholes", a minor obscenity in British vernacular, equating to "assholes". This led to calls on Netflix to change the title of the film for UK release; Netflix responded that it had no intention of retitling the film.

Reception 
On review aggregation website Rotten Tomatoes, the film has an approval rating of 88% based on 41 reviews and an average rating of 7.47/10. The website's critical consensus reads, "Our Souls at Night honors the quiet strength of its source material by offering a simple yet sturdy canvas for two talented veteran leads to bring its story to life." Metacritic assigned the film a weighted average score of 69 out of 100 based on 15 critics, indicating "generally favorable reviews".

References

External links
Our Souls At Night at Netflix
 
 

2017 films
2017 romantic drama films
Adultery in films
American romantic drama films
Films about old age
Films about parenting
Films about widowhood
Films based on American novels
Films directed by Ritesh Batra
Films scored by Elliot Goldenthal
Films set in Colorado
Films shot in Colorado
English-language Netflix original films
Films with screenplays by Scott Neustadter and Michael H. Weber
2010s English-language films
2010s American films